Tirana 5 is one of the 24 administrative units in Tirana. There are Petro Nini Luarasi and Besnik Sykja high schools. In this unit live 54,000 citizens.

Neighborhoods 
Blloku
 Selita
 Tirana e Re

References

Tirana 05